The 1881 Men's tennis tour  was composed of the sixth annual pre-open era tour now incorporated 65 tournaments staged in Australia, Canada, Great Britain and Ireland, and the United States. The 1881 Wimbledon Championships was won by William Renshaw. This year also saw the inaugural and important 1881 U.S. National Championships held at Newport Casino which Richard Sears won. This was also the year that the United States National Lawn Tennis Association, which is the world's first national tennis association, was founded. Renshaw then won two other big tournaments of the year, the Irish Lawn Tennis Championships and Princes Club Championships, whilst Richard Taswell Richardson won the prestigious Northern Championships.

The tour began in April in Cheltenham, England and ended in November in Melbourne, Australia.

Calendar 
Notes 1: Challenge round: the final round of a tournament, in which the winner of a single-elimination phase faces the previous year's champion, who plays only that one match. The challenge round was used in the early history of tennis (from 1877 through 1921), in some tournaments not all.* Indicates challenger
Notes 2:Tournaments in italics were events that were staged only onetime

Key

January to March
No events

April

May

June

July

August

September

October

November

December 
No events

List of tournament winners 
Note: important tournaments in bold
  William Renshaw—Cheltenham, Irish Championships, Princes Club, Wimbledon—(4)
  Richard Taswell Richardson—Aigburth, Waterloo, Northern Championships—(2)
  Michael G. McNamara—Brighton-Waterford—(2)
  Edward North Buxton—Lowick, Woodford Parish—(1)
  Richard Sears—U.S. National Championships—(1)
  Richard Barron Templer—Armagh—(1)
  Pelham George Dunop—Bath—(1)
  E. J. Charley—Belfast—(1)
  F. L. Rawson—Belfast—(1)
  Montague Hankey—Bournemouth—(1)
  C. Fairfax —Brighton—(1)
  Barcley Fowell Buxton—Cambridge—(1)
  Ernest Renshaw -Cheltenham (indoor)—(1)
  Dale Womerseley—Colchester—(1)
  F. E. Rook—Cirencester—(1)
  A. Springett—Darlington—(1)
  Robert Shaw Templer—Dundalk—(1)
  Edgar Lubbock—Eastbourne—(1)
  Dr. Walter W. Chamberlain—Edgbaston—(1)
  John G. Horn—Edinburgh—(1)
  Leslie Balfour-Melville—Edinburgh—(1)
  C. Martineau —Esher—(1)
  Spencer Cox—Exeter—(1)
  E. W. Mancounchy—Exmouth—(1)
  Edmond Bennett Brackenbury—Limerick—(1)
  Herbert Lawford—London—(1)
  Frederick Lawrence Rawson—London—(1)
  Richard Mercer—Maidstone—(1)
  Louis Whyte—Melbourne—(1)
  Peter Aungier—Naas—(1)
  John Jameson Cairnes -New York -(1)
  A.W. Soames-St Leonards-on-Sea-(1)
  Jonas Henry William Gardner-Stafford-(1)
  B. Champion Russell—Teignmouth—(1)
  Ernest Maconchy-Torquay-(1)
  Isidore F. Hellmuth—Toronto—(1)
  Wilfred Milne—Weybridge—(1)

Rankings 
Source: The Concise History of Tennis

See also 
 1881 Tennis Season
 1881 in sports

Notes

References

Sources 
 A Social History of Tennis in Britain: Lake, Robert J. (2014), Volume 5 of Routledge Research in Sports History. Routledge, UK, .
 Ayre's Lawn Tennis Almanack And Tournament Guide, 1908 to 1938, A. Wallis Myers.
 British Lawn Tennis and Squash Magazine, 1948 to 1967, British Lawn Tennis Ltd, UK.
 Dunlop Lawn Tennis Almanack And Tournament Guide, G.P. Hughes, 1939 to 1958, Dunlop Sports Co. Ltd, UK
 Lawn tennis and Badminton Magazine, 1906 to 1973, UK.
 Lowe's Lawn Tennis Annuals and Compendia, Lowe, Sir F. Gordon, Eyre & Spottiswoode
 Spalding's Lawn Tennis Annuals from 1885 to 1922, American Sports Pub. Co, USA.
 Sports Around the World: History, Culture, and Practice, Nauright John and Parrish Charles, (2012), ABC-CLIO, Santa Barbara, Cal, US, .
 The Concise History of Tennis, Mazak Karoly, (2010), 6th Edition, 2015.
 Tennis; A Cultural History, Gillmeister Heiner, (1997), Leicester University Press, Leicester, UK.
 The Tennis Book, edited by Michael Bartlett and Bob Gillen, Arbor House, New York, 1981 
 The World of Tennis Annuals, Barrett John, 1970 to 2001.
 Total Tennis:The Ultimate Tennis Encyclopedia, by Bud Collins, Sport Classic Books, Toronto, Canada, 
 Wright & Ditson Officially Adopted Lawn Tennis Guide's 1890 to 1920 Wright & Ditsons Publishers, Boston, Mass, USA.
 http://www.tennisarchives.com/1881 Men's Tennis season
 https://app.thetennisbase.com/1881 Men's Tennis season

External links 
 http://tennisarchives.com/
 https://thetennisbase.com/

Pre Open era tennis seasons
1881 in tennis